Jerónimo Barreto (born 1544 in Porto) was a Portuguese clergyman and bishop for the Roman Catholic Diocese of Funchal. He was ordained in 1573. He was appointed bishop of Faro in 1585. He died in 1589.

References 

1544 births
1589 deaths
Portuguese Roman Catholic bishops